This list of Tangut books comprises a list of manuscript and xylograph texts that are written in the extinct Tangut language and Tangut script.  These texts were mostly produced within the Western Xia dynasty (1038–1227) during the 12th and 13th centuries, and include Buddhist sutras and explanatory texts, dictionaries and other philological texts, as well as translations of Chinese books and some original Tangut texts.  Some Tangut texts, particularly Buddhist sutras, continued to be produced during the Yuan dynasty (1271–1368), after the fall of the Western Xia dynasty, but the Tangut language became extinct sometime during the Ming dynasty (1368–1644), and Tangut literature was only rediscovered in the early 20th century.

Most of the books listed here were discovered hidden in a stupa outside the city walls of the abandoned Western Xia fortress city of Khara-Khoto in Inner Mongolia by Pyotr Kuzmich Kozlov during his expedition of 1907–1909. A lesser number of texts (mostly fragments) were recovered from Khara-Khoto by Aurel Stein during his expedition of 1913–1916. A large number of complete and fragmentary Tangut texts have also been discovered at various sites in Inner Mongolia, Ningxia and Gansu in China during the 20th and 21st centuries.

Buddhist texts
A very large number of Buddhist texts have been preserved. Yevgeny Kychanov's 1999 catalogue of Buddhist texts from Khara-Khoto held at the Institute of Oriental Manuscripts of the Russian Academy of Sciences in Saint Petersburg lists 768 entries which cover 370 separate titles.

Dictionaries and philological works

Original Tangut texts

Translations of Chinese texts

See also

 Tangutology
 Cloud Platform at Juyongguan — 14th-century arch inscribed with Buddhist texts inscribed in Tangut and other languages
 Stele of Sulaiman — a 1348 stele at the Mogao Caves with the Buddhist mantra Om mani padme hum inscribed in Tangut and other languages
 Tangut dharani pillars — two dharani pillars inscribed with text of a dhāraṇī-sutra in Tangut script, dated 1502

Footnotes

References
 
 
 
 

Tangut books
Tangut books
Tangut script
 
Tangut books